The second HMS Seymour (K563) was a British Captain-class frigate of the Royal Navy in commission during World War II. Originally constructed as a United States Navy Buckley class destroyer escort, she served in the Royal Navy from 1943 to 1946.

Construction and transfer
The ship was laid down as the unnamed U.S. Navy destroyer escort DE-98 by Bethlehem-Hingham Shipyard, Inc., in Hingham, Massachusetts, on 1 September 1943 and launched on 1 November 1943. She was transferred to the United Kingdom upon completion on 23 December 1943.

Service history

Commissioned into service in the Royal Navy as the frigate HMS Seymour (K563) on 23 December 1943 simultaneously with her transfer, the ship served on patrol and escort duty for the remainder of World War II.
She sank the German motor torpedo boat  – an S-boat, known to the Allies as an "E-boat" – on 1 March 1945. The Royal Navy returned Seymour to the U.S. Navy on 5 January 1946.

Disposal
The U.S. Navy struck Seymour from its Naval Vessel Register on 25 February 1946. She was sold on 10 December 1946 for scrapping.

References
Navsource Online: Destroyer Escort Photo Archive Seymour (DE-98) HMS Seymour (K-563)
uboat.net HMS Seymour (K 563)
Destroyer Escort Sailors Association DEs for UK
Captain Class Frigate Association HMS Seymour K563 (DE 98)

 

 

Captain-class frigates
Buckley-class destroyer escorts
World War II frigates of the United Kingdom
Ships built in Hingham, Massachusetts
1943 ships